Noshiro City General Gymnasium is a gymnasium in Noshiro, Japan. It opened in 1993 and holds 2,012 people. Indirect efficient light fixtures are incorporated into the gym. There is no air conditioning in the gym. Noshiro Cup High School Basketball Tournament is a basketball tournament league held during 3–5 May every year at this gymnasium.

Facilities
Gymnasium - 1,896.96m2 (38m×49m)
Light exercise gymnasium - 633.94m2 (33.6m×19.2m)
Dojo - 245.78m2 (15.7m×16m)
Training room - 141.84m2

References

External links
Noshiro City Gymnasium

Akita Northern Happinets
Sports venues in Akita Prefecture
Indoor arenas in Japan
Basketball venues in Japan
Sports venues completed in 1993
1993 establishments in Japan
Noshiro, Akita